Mohamed Samir Thabet Abdel Rehim (born on November 5, 1987) is an Egyptian Defender footballer who currently plays for Pluakdaeng United.

Club career 

Mohamed Samir made his debut for Al Ahly against Enppi in the 2007/2008 season, he was sent off in that game. Samir was one of the few youngsters to play under former coach Manuel Jose. Samir scored his first Al Ahly goal from the penalty spot in a pre-season match against Wydad Casablanca of Morocco which Al Ahly won 2-0. His second goal came against Ittihad El Shorta also from the spot, which Al Ahly won 4-2.

References 

Egyptian footballers
Al Ahly SC players
1987 births
Living people
Association football defenders